Alan Howarth, born 1948, is an American composer and sound designer who has worked on soundtracks for Hollywood films including the Star Trek and Halloween series, and is known for his collaborations with film director and composer John Carpenter.

Childhood and early career
Alan Howarth grew up in Cleveland, Ohio. Playing music in local rock bands, he opened for national touring acts including The Who and Cream. He then began to create original music in bands Braino and Pi Corp, using synthesizers. From 1976 he provided synthesizer support for fusion jazz band Weather Report, which relocated him to Los Angeles. Howarth caught his big break in 1980 when his music was used for a Star Trek movie trailer. After that he worked on the next five Star Trek films.

Films

Howarth's collaborations with John Carpenter include: Escape from New York, Halloween II, Halloween III: Season of the Witch, Christine, Big Trouble in Little China, Prince of Darkness and They Live.

His music has been featured in films like The Osterman Weekend, The Lost Empire, Retribution, Halloween 4: The Return of Michael Myers, Halloween 5: The Revenge of Michael Myers, Halloween: The Curse of Michael Myers, The Dentist and The Dentist 2, Boo, Evilution, Basement Jack, Hansel and Gretel, Zombie Night, and Brutal.

His award-winning sound designs have appeared in Star Trek: The Motion Picture, Star Trek II: The Wrath of Khan, Star Trek III: The Search for Spock, Star Trek IV: The Voyage Home, Star Trek V: The Final Frontier, and Star Trek VI: The Undiscovered Country, Raiders of the Lost Ark, Poltergeist, Back to the Future Part II, Back to the Future Part III, The Little Mermaid and Total Recall. His team received Academy Award awards for Best Sound Effects for The Hunt for Red October and Bram Stoker's Dracula directed by Francis Ford Coppola. He has also created some sound effects for Sound Ideas's award-winning "Series 6000: The General" royalty-free sound effects library.

Live performance
Howarth performs his film scores in live concert to excerpts from the films, and has performed in Geneva, Kraków, St. Petersburg, New York, Los Angeles, Toronto, London and Paris.

Sound technology
Howarth pioneered immersive multi-channel surround sound systems with Steven Taylor's "Dimension Audio" that included the early prototype theatrical 48.4 systems that are now known as Dolby Atmos and DTS sound immersion. His current research has resulted in founding of RA Music, which holds several worldwide patents for the conversion of standard musical recordings into tunings of the Natural Frequency Spectrum as defined by nature, science and ancient architecture.

Filmography

References

External links
Official website

RA Music Website

Living people
American film score composers
American sound designers
Musicians from Cleveland
American male film score composers
Year of birth missing (living people)
Varèse Sarabande Records artists